Dušan Velkaverh (12 September 1943 – 1 February 2016) was a Slovenian lyricist.

Early life
Dušan Velkaverh was born on 12 September 1943 in Georgetown, British Guiana (now Guyana) to a Slovene sailor and an English nurse. In 1942, during World War II, his father joined the crew of an alliance ship, torpedoed off the coast of South America. He met his wife, a daughter of a colonial clerk, in the hospital where he was recovering. Velkaverh was born a year later.

Soon after his birth, the family moved to New York City, where they stayed for a short period of time. Shortly after that, the family moved to London. In 1948, they moved to Yugoslavia. At first, they lived in Belgrade, where his father got the job as a deputy of the minister of shipping, then they relocated to Rijeka. In 1956, the family came to Slovenia, first to Portorož and then to Ljubljana, where Velkaverh lived for the rest of his life. Velkaverh's mother and father spoke English. He learned Slovene at the age of 13. Previously he only spoke English and Serbo-Croatian. In 2007, he visited his birth house in Georgetown for the first time after sixty-four years. He was married three times and has three children. During the last years of his life, he was living in Vrhnika.

Work
He is considered a legend of the Slovenian song festival history since about thirty of his 600 lyrics became major hits in Slovenia. In 2011 a concert was held in Križanke Summer Theatre, Ljubljana, with him as an honorary guest, where his greatest hits were interpreted by the Slovenian National TV's Symphony Orchestra and RTV Slovenia Big Band with many singers who sung them originally, as well as younger ones. He was awarded a Slovenian National TV award for his work at the same event.

He was a longtime chief of music production at RTV Slovenia for the RTV Slovenia Big Band and RTV Slovenia Symphony Orchestra. He wrote lyrics for "Dan ljubezni", a Yugoslavian song performed at the Eurovision Song Contest 1975 by Slovenian vocal band "Pepel in kri". In the early 1990s, he was the executive director of Slovenian music label Corona.

Lyrics

References

1943 births
2016 deaths
People from Georgetown, Guyana
Slovenian lyricists
Slovenian people of English descent